Hossein Panahi Dezhkooh  (28 August 1956 – 4 August 2004) was an Iranian actor and poet.
After graduating from high school, due to his father's recommendation, he found his way to Ayatollah Golpaygaani's religious class. He then returned to his hometown as a religious figure, but this lasted only for a few months. He then moved to Tehran and started studying in Anahita art school for four years and graduated as an actor and a screenwriter.

He started his acting career in a TV show named: Mahalleh Behdaasht (Hygiene Neighborhood). He then performed in some TV shows written by himself which were not much successful. He later received recognition from a show named Two ducks in fog. He was the writer and director of the show as well as performing in it. This was his breakthrough and people requested his shows to be broadcast again.

He died of a heart attack at the age of 47. He was buried in the city of Soogh next to his mother.

Filmography

Films
 Bab'Aziz (2005)
 Ghessé hayé kish (1999) (segment "The Greek Boat")
 The Fateful Day (1995)
 Mard-e na-tamam (1992)
 Mohajeran (1992)
 Avinar (1991)
 Hey Joe! (1988)

Theater
Chizi Shabih-e Zendegi
Do Morghabi Dar Meh

TV series
Mahalle-ye Behdasht
Roozi Roozegari
Azhans-e Doosti
Imam Ali
Dozdan-e Madabozorg
Koochak-e Jangali
Yahya va Golabatoon
Roozegar-e Gharib
Hasht Behesht

Books
Man va Nazi
Setareh
Goldan va Aftab
Payambar-e Bi Ketab
Del-e Shir

References

External links

 Hossein Panahi Official Website
 Grave-man of August: Homage to Hossein Panahi

1956 births
2004 deaths
Iranian male actors
Iranian male poets
20th-century Iranian poets
Iranian Shia clerics
20th-century male writers